Will Felder (born March 9, 1991) is an American professional basketball player. Felder usually plays as power forward and is known for his athletic playing style.

College career
Felder played four seasons collegiate, two for Saint Francis (PA) and two for the Miami RedHawks.

Professional career
For the 2014–15 season, Felder signed with Dutch side ZZ Leiden of the Dutch Basketball League (DBL). In his debut DBL season, Felder averaged 10 points and 4.8 rebounds per game over 31 games. Felder also led the league in blocks, as he averaged 1.2 blocks per game.

References

External links
Eurobasket.com player profile
Miami profile

1991 births
Living people
American expatriate basketball people in the Netherlands
American men's basketball players
Basketball players from Cleveland
B.S. Leiden players
Dutch Basketball League players
Miami RedHawks men's basketball players
Power forwards (basketball)
Saint Francis Red Flash men's basketball players